The Jonas Brothers World Tour 2009 was the sixth concert tour and third headlining tour by the Jonas Brothers. It began on May 18, 2009 in Lima, Peru and ended on December 13, 2009 in San Juan, Puerto Rico. The Jonas Brothers played on multiple continents around the world. Honor Society and Wonder Girls served as the opening acts, with Jordin Sparks as a special guest. The tour coincided with the release of their fourth studio album Lines, Vines and Trying Times which was released on June 16, 2009.  The tour won the Eventful Fans' Choice Award at the 2009 Billboard Touring Awards and became the 6th highest selling tour in 2009 after The Circus Tour, the I Am... World Tour, the Sticky & Sweet Tour, the U2 360° Tour and the Wonder World Tour.

Stage

The stage  was set up as an in-the-round at the center of the venue measuring 144-feet-wide to allow for better audience viewing. It incorporated many features such as a one of a kind large circular water screen, a giant crane that extends over the audience, laser and automated video effects and a double Lazy Susan at the center stage, consisting of one in the center and an outer one as a ring around the other. It was designed similar to Britney Spears' Circus Tour. The tour used this stage for all of its legs except for the Caribbean and the South America legs of the tour, where they then decided to use a normal stage with catwalk instead.

Support
Demi Lovato supported them in Europe and also in all their Latin America tour dates.

British girl group Girls Can't Catch performed in United Kingdom tour dates.

The Wonder Girls, a South Korean girl group, joined the Jonas Brothers in various North American tour dates.  Although, on July 1, it was announced that the Jonas Brothers and their management asked the Wonder Girls to open for their entire tour.

Also new pop singer Jessie James was added as a guest on tour. She served as a host for the concerts in June introducing each act and performing her single Wanted. She performed in all of the shows in June, 2009. She however did not perform at the Portland, Oregon concert.

Jordin Sparks did not appear at the San Antonio or Nashville shows because of throat problems, which couldn't let her sing. She did not appear at the New Orleans show because she was attending her boyfriend's funeral.

Valerius  (Opening Act, the Netherlands, Belgium, Ireland and France)
Banda Cine (Opening Act at Brazil)
Bocatabú (Opening Act at Dominican Republic)
The Dolly Rockers
Marilanne (Venezuela)
Margarita Perez (Panama)
Tuxido (North America Part 2 and Mexico)
Demi Lovato (South America, Europe, surprise guest at Toronto)
Everlife (Special Guests at Nashville)
Honor Society (North America)
Jessie James (select dates in North America)
Jordin Sparks (North America, Mexico)
McFly (Surprise Guests at London)
Miley Cyrus (Surprise Guest at Dallas)
Wonder Girls (North America)
Girls Can't Catch (United Kingdom)
Jacopo Sarno (Opening Act at Italy)
Joy Mendy (Surprise guest at London)

Support acts setlists

Jonas Brothers setlists

Tour dates

Cancelled shows

References

Notes

Citations

2009 concert tours
Jonas Brothers concert tours